Atle Vårvik (born 12 December 1965) is a value and goal oriented social entrepreneur and former top athlete.

Vårvik started MOT in 1994 and has in the period 1994-2020 created MOT’s concept and brand profile that is today strengthening youth’s life, awareness, robustness and courage on four continents.

Vårvik is a former Norwegian Champion, Olympic participant and one of the world’s best speed skaters. He shocked the entire speed skating world with the aerodynamic “Donald Duck suit”.

He has background in leader development, as mentor and coach within business, top athletics and public sector.

In 2015, Vårvik received the Honorary Award from the Norwegian Confederation of Sports for his work with MOT, and in 2014, he got one of Norway’s greatest leadership and value awards – the Reitan Group’s “Årets Ladejarl”.

Biography 
Atle Vårvik is married to Sigrun and together they have two sons, Kristian (1992) and Johann (1995). 

Vårvik is value and goal oriented and passionate about values. He is passionate about strengthening youths’ robustness and courage. He is passionate about a warmer and safer society. He is passionate about preventing social problems in the society. His big passion has always been the Human being, Life and Performance groups.

Atle has a lot of human and life competence from his parents, who have both worked with people in their professions.

Vårvik is a social entrepreneur. He moves quickly from plan to implementation and is result and action oriented. He creates systems that prevent social problems in the society through strengthening peoples’ values, attitude, quality of life and feeling of mastery. He has been passionate about life and developing people since he was a young boy. Since 1977, he has been doing research on why crime and why some people ruin their own lives, others' lives and the society.

Vårvik has a professional background from business (real estate agent), the Customs and the 1997 Nordic World Ski Championships. He is a leadership developer with a business spirit and for two years he ran the company “Positive leadership” were the main programme was “Courage to lead”.

In 2005, Atle vas a “Minister” in the “P1-Government”. NRK (Norwegian Broadcasting) gathered a representative from each county in Norway, who were nominated by the listeners and Atle represented the county “Sør-Trøndelag”. The P1-Government made a manifest that was handed over to the Norwegian Government. The manifest looked at Norway 100 years ahead, how Norway would look and what challenges Norway would meet in 100 years and how they could be solved. The vision was: “A courageous Norway – light, playful and awake”.

MOT 
Vårvik had the idea to MOT and is MOT’s principal founder and creator. He is the main architect behind MOT's philosophy, programmes, culture, concept and brand profile, and the organisations MOT Norway and MOT Foundation. Vårvik has been the top leader of MOT in the period 1994-2020.  

MOT is about developing youth's robustness and quality of life, and about strengthening people's awareness and courage – courage to live, courage to care and courage to say no. MOT was founded to prevent crime and social society problems.

Honors and awards 
In 2015, Vårvik received the Honorary Award from the Norwegian Confederation of Sports for his work with MOT (and Johann Olav Koss for Right to Play). The Norwegian prime minister proclaimed the jury’s decision:

The Honorary Award points at role models within top athletics, who use their positions to build good values in society. The jury wants to express its admiration for two ideas showing great generosity and two dreams that have grown into something meaningful, both in Norwegian local communities as well as in conflicted and poor areas of the world. This year's award goes to two persons who have created something unique – something that makes a difference to many, and of what we all may be proud of.

In 2014, Vårvik received one of Norway’s greatest leadership and value awards – the Reitan Group’s value award and the title “Årets Ladejarl”. The jury’s decision:

«Atle Vårvik is passionate about a warmer and safer society. He has put the life of youth in the centre and built MOT’s philosophy on three values: courage to live, courage to care and courage to say no. As leader for MOT, Atle has contributed to inspire, create awareness and strengthen youth’s robustness. Robust youth with courage is useful to the society Atle develops local enthusiasts and ambassadors as commanders to build the brand profile. He has involved well known role models from top athletics, art and culture to achieve results. MOT, as a brand, shall remind youth that they can think themselves robust and dare to care about themselves and others.

Atle Vårvik engages in excellent value-based leadership and work, both nationally and internationally. He proves with MOT the importance of building strong concepts. Atle have had the ability to build a concept that gives people something to believe in. As leader he is a cultural architect with unique communication skills, a great philosophy and scent.

He is skilled at developing people for them to make good decisions, and a role model for inspiration and personal responsibility. He has for many years shown the will and energy to implement, that has triggered engagement and prevented indifference far beyond Norway’s borders. Atle is a strong identity-builder, culture-builder, director and strategist. He is also a merchant in that he has created revenue and kept costs down.”

Athlete career 
Atle Vårvik is a former Norwegian speed skater and top athlete.

Vårvik started his top athlete carrier when he cycled Den Store Styrkeprøven (The Great Trial of Strength) Trondheim to Oslo 540 km (340 mi) at the age of 13.

He participated in two Olympic Games and has experience from the culture within top athletics.

In 1994, Vårvik launched the special and aerodynamic speedskating suit the “Donald Duck suit”.

“The regulations for speed skating were changed after Atle Vårvik presented his “Donald Duck suit” – a suit that was later tested to have 2/3 of the air resistance compared to the ordinary suits”. Professor Lars Sætran, NTNU (Aftenposten)

Best results as speed skater 
World Cup 5000m 93’/94’ – 8th place in the totals
World Championship 1988 best Norwegian result
Olympic Games 1992
Olympiske Games 1994
Norwegian Champion 10.000m 1992 
Norwegian Champion speed skating marathon 1988 
Norwegian Champion speed skating marathon 1989
Norwegian Champion junior 1983

Books 
The value book «mot til å leve» – 2003 (20.000 books printed/sold)
The brand book «Sjer dåkk me» – 2004
“Viljen” – 2004 (co-author)
“Eventyret MOT” – 2005 (co-author)
“Inspirasjonen” – 2012
The MOT philosophy – 2017
Life and leadership – a different autobiography – 2018
The Diamond – 2017 and 2019
“Norske idrettshelter – 25 years anniversary” – 2019
Courage to live – 2020

References

External links 
Atle's blog - The MOT-blog of Atle Vårvik
MOT official website

1965 births
Living people
Sportspeople from Trondheim
Norwegian male speed skaters
Olympic speed skaters of Norway
Speed skaters at the 1992 Winter Olympics
Speed skaters at the 1994 Winter Olympics